Lugnet may refer to:

 A part of Lugnet och Skälsmara, a locality in Värmdö Municipality, Sweden
 Lugnet, Malmö, a neighbourhood of Malmö Municipality, Sweden
 Lugnet, Falun, a sports complex in Falun, Sweden
 LUGNET, a Lego-oriented online community